Tapa (German: Taps) is a town in  Tapa Parish, Lääne-Viru County, Estonia, located at the junction of the country's Tallinn–Narva (west–east) and Tallinn–Tartu–Valga (north–south) railway lines.It is an important centre of transit for freight (mainly Russian oil and timber) as well as rail passengers (mostly Estonian commuters), a home to soldiers since the 1930s. Tapa also plays an important role in training young men and women in the Estonian Defense Forces, being nearby to Keskpolügoon (Central training area). The Valgejõgi River passes Tapa on its northeastern side.

Tapa developed as a village in the 13th–14th centuries. It was first mentioned in 1482 and the Tapa knight manor in 1629. Tapa was officially recognized as a town in 1926. In October 2005, the town merged with the municipalities of Lehtse Parish, Saksi Parish, and Jäneda Parish to form Tapa Parish.

Tapa Museum was opened on 10 June 2004. The museum, in a 1934  two-storey house, collects and exhibits objects including photos and documents related to the history and culture of Tapa. All of the objects in the museum reflect the soul of Tapa's citizens, past and present. Temporary exhibits celebrate notable days in Tapa's history and feature hobbies of the town's residents. The permanent collection presents Tapa as a railway, military, and sausage town.

Railway

Tapa owes its existence to the railroad. (The three long, white rectangles on Tapa's flag represent the three branches of the railway that meet there.) In the 1860s, there were only native meadows where Tapa sits today. Forests of fir trees were chopped down as railroad tracks were laid eastward from Paldiski (in northwestern Estonia) to St. Petersburg, Russia. The Baltic Railway Company opened the tracks on 24 October 1870. Construction of the Tapa–Tartu branch of the railway began in 1875, and the first train to Tartu passed through Tapa on 21 August 1876. From that day on, Tapa grew quickly as a railway town. Land was purchased from the Tapa Manor to build a railway station and a depot for repairing and maintaining locomotives. The repair shop opened in 1876. The station was given the German name Taps from the manor, and the town got its name from the station.

Military bases

Tapa has been known as both a railway and a military town throughout its history. On 1 August 1923, an armoured train regiment was formed in Tapa with two armoured wagons: the Kapten Irv, which served in the Estonian War of Independence, and the Onu Tom. On 30 November 1934, a regiment in Valga (in southern Estonia) was moved to Tapa. The regiment's base, located on the southern edge of town around Tapa Manor's main building, played a considerable role in the town's life and contributed to the town's continued development.

In January 1941, however, the regiment was dissolved by Soviet forces. Seven months later, on 14 August 1941, Nazi German troops took over Tapa. During the German occupation, German military items were housed where the Estonian armoured train regiment's headquarters had been. In 1972, the engineering-technical education military unit no. 67665 of the Soviet army was on the site.

There has been an airfield on the southern edge of Tapa since 1932. The Tapa Aerial Union held its first fly in on 30 September 1934. The Russians began building a military airfield on the site in the fall of 1939. The Soviets began extensive construction of a military airfield in the spring of 1952. MiG-17s were stationed at the base by the end of the same year. Later, Tapa Airfield was made home to the Soviet 656th Interceptor Aviation Regiment. In 1993, the Estonian Defence Ministry assumed control of the airfield. On 18 June 1993, the first civilian plane touched down on the cement runway.
     
As the Soviet troops and their families left Tapa, the town's population dropped from 10,395 in 1989 to 6,800 in 2000. Tapa was left with a vacant, ransacked, poorly constructed military district. Yet, its life as a military town did not end. In January 2002, following changes in the structure of Estonian defence units, Tapa again became the home of a military base. The Northeast Defence District in Tapa includes an army training center, an artillery battalion, an anti-aircraft battalion and an engineer battalion.

The base is also home to a British-led eFP battlegroup, as part of 1st Infantry Brigade.

Today, on the north wall of Tapa's railway station, there is a bronze plaque, originally dedicated on 9 January 1934 and re-dedicated on 20 February 1993, that commemorates the Estonian War of Independence. On the plaque is the symbol of Tapa's armoured train regiment. Called "Flying Death on the Railway", the symbol is a skull with a pair of angel wings and wagon train wheels behind it.

Religion and culture

Throughout Tapa's history, in between the depot and the military base, civic and religious institutions have flourished. At services on 2 December 2007, the first Sunday of Advent, the congregation of the St. Jacob's Lutheran Church, celebrated its 75th anniversary.

A temporary house of prayer was dedicated in Tapa on 19 June 1921 by the first bishop of the EELK Jaak Kukk. It was named after the apostle John. St. Jacob's was dedicated on 27 November 1932, the first Sunday of Advent. Either August Tauk or Anatoli Podchekayev is the architect of the neo-historical stone church. The altarpiece, called the "Joyous Christ" or "Come to me", was painted by Russian icon artist Olga Obolyaninova. The church was renovated from 1953–55 and from 1972–74.

On 10 June 2007, the Baptist church in Tapa celebrated its 75th anniversary. The church was established on 12 June 1932, and Philip Gildemann was its first pastor. In 1940, with Gottfried Palias as pastor (1933–45), services moved to Tapa's Methodist church building. In 1980, with Dimitri Lipping as pastor (1976–92), it acquired the building at Kooli street 1 for Sunday school and other youth programs. In November 2003, it changed its name to the Tapa Living Faith Church. It holds Sunday services, with simultaneous translation into Russian, in Tapa's Methodist church at Kesk street 11.

At 75, Tapa's Baptist church had 40 members: 58 percent were between the ages of 21 and 74 and 68 percent were female. There were 50 participants in its Sunday school and more than 100 youth in its summer camp. Its other pastors were Evald Aer (1945–56), Paldor Teekel (1956–60), Eduard Kaur (1961), Erich Sõmer (1962–67), Heino Kivisild and Arli Tammo (1968–1975), and Toomas Kivisild (from 1993). The church belongs to the Union of Free Evangelical and Baptist Churches of Estonia.

On 17 March 2007, Tapa Music School celebrated its 50th anniversary with a concert by its students and its graduates. Like many Estonian towns, Tapa has a music school that is second only to the local elementary and high school in educating children and preparing them for successful lives as teenagers and young adults. The music school opened in the fall of 1957. Peeter Kald was the school's director from 1979 until 2007, when his son Ilmar was named director.

The town is also the site of a sausage festival.

Estonian language

On 30 May 1908, learned individuals from Tallinn and Tartu met in Tapa to agree on how the Estonian language should be written. By the beginning of the 19th century, two forms of Estonian had evolved: a Tallinn Estonian in the north and a Tartu Estonian in the south. So the Estonian Literary Society in Tartu and the Literature Department of the Folk Education Society of Estonia in Tallinn convened a conference. The first of four conferences that were held from 1908 to 1911 was in Tapa, because it was easily accessible by train from both Tallinn and Tartu. The meeting took place in the Harmonie room of what is today Tapa's music school.

What was so different about what Estonians in the north were writing and what their fellow countrymen just 240 km to the south were writing? The spelling of some words was different because the pronunciation of the words was different. For example, the word pea (head) in the south was pää in the north, hea (good) was hää, and seal (there) was sääl. Similarly, õõ at one end of the country was written õe at the other end, õuu was õu, and the -gi ending was written -ki. Also, in both the north and the south the h sound at the beginning of a word, like hõbune (horse) and hoidma (to hold), was clearly written but softly spoken. So the conference participants wanted to decide if the h should be written if it is not pronounced.

On 30 May 2008, the 100th anniversary of this conference, Tapa organized another conference on the Estonian language with esteemed representatives from the Mother Tongue Society (Emakeele Selts), the Estonian Language Institute, the Language Inspectorate of the Estonian Ministry of Education (Keeleinspektsioon), the Estonian Ministry of Education and Research, Tartu University's Estonian and General Linguistics Institut, and the Estonian Writers' Union. The theme of the conference was "Language Grows from Me" (Keel kasvab minust enesest). The master of ceremonies was Marika Rajur of the Tapa Literary Club.

Before the conference began, a plaque to commemorate the very first conference was unveiled in front of the music school by Kuno Rooba, Tapa's mayor. The plaque reads "The first conference on written Estonian took place in Tapa" (Tapal toimus esimene eesti kirjakeele konverents).

Trivia

 The railway station in Tapa served as the Tallinn railway station in the 2008 Estonian movie Detsembrikuumus (December Heat).
 The phrase "the burning water of Tapa" (Estonian: Tapa põlev vesi) refers to the fact that so much fuel from Soviet MiG-23 fighters leaked into Tapa's ground water that one could actually light a glass of tap water on fire.
 In Estonian, "tapa" is also the imperative form of the verb "kill". This has led to an urban legend that during Soviet times the town had a newspaper called Tapa Kommunist, which could mean either Communist of Tapa, or Kill a Communist. Later the name was changed to Tapa Edasi, which could mean either Tapa Forward, or Keep Killing. In reality the local party newspaper was called Edasi Kommunismile (Forward to Communism).
 Similarly, where a backroad from Kadrina comes to a T at route 24, a sign gives drivers directions to "Tapa" (to the left) or to "Loobu" (to the right). In Estonian, loobuma means to abandon, to desist, to waive. Therefore, drivers have the options to "Kill" or "Quit".

Sister cities

The former municipality of Tapa was twinned with:
  Akaa, Finland
  Preetz, Germany
  Dobele, Latvia
  Trosa Municipality, Sweden
  Cumberland, United States

Gallery

External links

Tapa Museum 
Tapa Sausage Festival

References

Sources 
Lääne Viru Maavalitsus, 2007 Lääne Virumaa Yearbook. Estonian: Lääne Virumaa Aastaraamat. Rakvere, 2008.

 
Cities and towns in Estonia
Former municipalities of Estonia
Kreis Jerwen